Ephysteris eremaula is a moth in the family Gelechiidae. It was described by Anthonie Johannes Theodorus Janse in 1960. It is found in Namibia and South Africa.

References

Ephysteris
Moths described in 1960